RDI may refer to:

Organisations 
 Ici RDI, formerly Réseau de l'information, a Canadian French language news channel owned by Radio-Canada
 Rassemblement démocratique pour l'indépendance, unofficial banner of dissident deputies of Parti Québécois in 1984–1985
 RDI Video Systems, a video game company
 Renew Democracy Initiative, an American political organization promoting and defending liberal democracy
 Resource Development International, Louisville, Kentucky organization that works on water, sanitation, education, and community development projects
 Response Dynamics, a conservative direct marketing firm
 Rural Development Institute, Canadian research center

Science and technology 
 Radar Doppler à Impulsions, air intercept radar on French Mirage 2000C fighters that was developed from the Radar Doppler Multifunction
 Reference Daily Intake or Recommended Daily Intake, a quantity of recommended nutrient intake
 Relationship Development Intervention, a treatment for autism
 Resistance Database Initiative, a not-for-profit HIV/AIDS research organisation
 Respiratory disturbance index, a tool for measuring frequency of breathing related sleep disturbances
 RDI register, a 64-bit processor register of x86 CPUs
 Reflected DOM Injection, an XSS technique

Other
 Royal Designers for Industry, a British honour bestowed on leading designers by the Royal Society of Arts